The Army of Arauco was a professional army in the service of the kings of Spain that was based in Spanish-Mapuche frontier, south-central Chile, during the 16th to 19th centuries. It was notable for being a rare example of a standing army in the Americas. The army was established after the disastrous Destruction of the Seven Cities (1598–1604) to fight in the Arauco War against anti-Spanish Mapuche coalitions. The army was financed by silver from Potosí, in a payment called Real Situado. With the army headquarters being in Concepción this city became the "military capital" of Chile.

The Army of Arauco shaped the economy of southern Chile as it created a demand for wine and it meant an inflow of silver. This stimulated the Chilean wine industry as well as the Mapuche silverwork tradition. In addition Guaraní indians serving the army are thought to have helped establish the custom of drinking yerba mate in southern Chile.

See also
 Soldado de cuera

References

Arauco War
Warfare of the Early Modern period
Eighty Years' War
Military units and formations of Spain
Military units and formations established in 1604
1604 establishments in the Spanish Empire
Mapuche history